Joseph Janni (21 May 1916 – 29 May 1994) was a British film producer best known for his work with John Schlesinger. He was born into a Jewish family in Milan, Italy and became interested in filmmaking while at university. 

He emigrated to England in 1939, and once Italy declared war, he was briefly interned in Metropole Camp on the Isle of Man.

He later became involved in the British film industry and worked his way up to producer. He produced the first films of John Schlesinger and Ken Loach.

Selected filmography
 Headline (1944)
The Glass Mountain (1949)
White Corridors (1951)
Honeymoon Deferred (1951)
Something Money Can't Buy (1952)
Romeo and Juliet (1954)
A Town Like Alice (1956)
Robbery Under Arms (1957)
The Captain's Table (1958)
The Savage Innocents (1962)
A Kind of Loving (1962)
Billy Liar (1963)
Darling (1965)
Modesty Blaise (1966)
Far from the Madding Crowd (1967)
Poor Cow (1967)
In Search of Gregory (1969)
Sunday Bloody Sunday (1971)
Made (1972)
Los Amigos (1973)
Yanks (1979)

References

External links

Joseph Janni at Screenonline

British film producers
1916 births
1994 deaths
People interned in the Isle of Man during World War II